The Fixer Uppers is a 1935 short film starring Laurel and Hardy, directed by Charles Rogers and produced by Hal Roach.

Plot
Christmas card salesmen Stan and Ollie are persuaded to help a woman (Mae Busch) spice up her loveless marriage by making her husband jealous. The spouse involved, a temperamental artist played by (Charles Middleton), is however made rather too jealous for comfort, and puts Ollie in peril when he challenges him to a duel to the death at midnight and pledges to track him "to the end of the world" if he does not show up.

Stan and Ollie discuss the challenge in a nearby bar and it occurs to them that the husband cannot know where they live, so Ollie complacently telephones him to inform him he will not be there and they both insult him. They then get drunk with a neighbor of the couple (played by Arthur Housman). The police are called and finding the artist's business card with his home address in Ollie's pocket, they take Stan and Ollie to the couple's apartment and dump them on their bed to sleep it off. They are discovered when Stan starts snoring. Pistols are produced but the wife tells Ollie she has replaced the bullets with blanks. The husband shoots at Ollie, who plays dead and the pair then run for their lives and manage to give him the slip. The film ends with Ollie sighing to the camera from the back of a horse-drawn garbage truck, after having hidden in a trash can.

Cast
 Stan Laurel as Stan
 Oliver Hardy as Oliver
 Mae Busch as Madame Pierre Gustav
 Charles Middleton as Pierre Gustave
 Arthur Housman as the drunk man
 Noah Young as the bartender

Notes
The penultimate Laurel and Hardy short comedy made at Hal Roach Studios, the film is a reworking of Slipping Wives (1927) a silent comedy the comedians appeared in before they teamed up.

The Fixer Uppers was partially remade by The Three Stooges in 1940 as Boobs in Arms.

References

External links
 
 

1935 films
1935 comedy films
American black-and-white films
Films directed by Charley Rogers
Laurel and Hardy (film series)
Metro-Goldwyn-Mayer short films
1935 short films
American comedy short films
1930s American films